Rasad-1 (meaning Observation) was an Iranian satellite which was launched in 2011. The third Iranian satellite, and the second to be launched successfully using an indigenous rocket, Rasad-1 was Iran's first imaging satellite. It made approximately fifteen orbits per day.

Rasad-1 was launched on the maiden flight of the Safir-B rocket, designated Safir-B1, from a launch site in Semnan Province, Iran. The launch occurred at approximately 09:14 UTC on 15 June 2011 with the spacecraft reaching orbit several minutes later.

It was equipped with solar panels to generate power. The satellite decayed from orbit three weeks after launch, on 6 July 2011.

See also

Omid

References

External links
n2yo.com
 

Satellites of Iran
2011 in Iran
Spacecraft launched in 2011
Spacecraft which reentered in 2011